Andrija Stipanović (born 18 December 1986) is a Bosnian-Herzegovinian professional basketball player for Cluj of the Romanian Liga Națională. He also represents the Bosnia and Herzegovina national basketball team internationally.

Stipanović spent the 2019-20 season with Cedevita Olimpija of the Slovenian League, averaging 6.1 points and 3.4 rebounds per game. On 26 June 2020 he signed with Cluj.

References

External links
 Andrija Stipanović at eurobasket.com
 Andrija Stipanović at fiba.com
  Andrija Stipanović at legabasket.it
 Andrija Stipanović at tblstat.net

1986 births
Living people
ABA League players
Basketball players from Mostar
BC Oostende players
Bosnia and Herzegovina men's basketball players
Büyükçekmece Basketbol players
Centers (basketball)
Croatian expatriate basketball people in Italy
Croatian expatriate basketball people in Turkey
Croatian men's basketball players
Croats of Bosnia and Herzegovina
CS Universitatea Cluj-Napoca (men's basketball) players
Juvecaserta Basket players
KK Cedevita Olimpija players
KK Cedevita players
KK Split players
Liège Basket players
Trabzonspor B.K. players
Vanoli Cremona players